Kabel Digital is a German digital cable pay TV platform owned by Kabel Deutschland.

Kabel Digital Home
 13th Street
 AXN
 Kabel 1 Classics
 Kinowelt TV
 Sci Fi
 Silverline
 The History Channel
 National Geographic Channel
 Planet
 Spiegel TV Digital
 Wetterfernsehen
 BBC Prime
 E!
 Fashion TV
 G-TV
 Sat. 1 Comedy
 TV Gusto Premium
 Wein TV
 Boomerang
 Playhouse Disney
 Toon Disney
 Toon Disney +1
 ESPN Classic
 Extreme Sports Channel
 Motors TV
 NASN
 Sailing Channel
 Gute Laune TV
 MTV Dance
 MTV Hits
 Trace TV
 VH1 Classic
 Playboy TV
 Xtra Music

Kabel Digital International
 AXN
 BBC Prime
 BBC World
 Boomerang
 CNBC Europe
 ESPN Classic
 Extreme Sports Channel
 MTV Dance
 MTV Hits
 NASN
 National Geographic Channel
 Sailing Channel
 Sky News
 TCM
 Toon Disney
 VH1 Classic
 ATV Avrupa
 Euro D
 Euro Star
 Kanal 7 Int.
 Lig TV
 Show Türk
 Sinematürk
 TGRT EU
 TRT Int.
 Channel One Russia
 Detsky Mir
 Euro News Rossiya
 Nashe Kino
 RTR Planeta
 RTV Int.
 Canal 24 Horas
 Euro News España
 TVE Int.
 ITVN
 TVP Polonia
 Euro News Portugal
 RTP Int.
 Euro News Italia
 Rai Uno
 Rai Due
 Rai Tre
 ERT Sat

References

External links
 Kabel Deutschland website
 Kabel Digital website

Cable television companies of Germany